Sovdepiya may refer to:
 Russian Soviet Federative Socialist Republic
 Union of Soviet Socialist Republics